Austrian rapper and dancehall musician RAF Camora has released seven studio albums, six extended plays, six mixtapes, five collaborative albums and fifty-four singles (including fifteen as a featured artist). RAF Camora was awarded for sales of 8.4 million records in Austria, Germany and Switzerland.

RAF Camora's career started in 2003 with the release of Assaut Mystik & Balkan Express as part of Family Bizz. His first records as a solo artist Therapie vor dem Album (2008) and Nächster Stopp Zukunft (2009), couldn't enter the charts. His first chart success were with Artkore (2010), alongside Austrian rapper Nazar and Therapie nach dem Album (2010), both reaching the top fifty in Austria. RAF Camoras following releases RAF 3.0 (2012), Hoch 2 (2013) and Zodiak (2014), with Chakuza and Joshi Mizu and Ghøst (2016), peaked in the top ten of Austria and Germany.

His fourth collaborative album Palmen aus Plastik with Bonez MC (2016), debuted at number one in German-speaking Europe and is certified gold by IFPI Austria and platinum by the Bundesverband Musikindustrie (BVMI). The album spawned four singles; "Palmen aus Plastik", "Ruhe nach dem Sturm", "Mörder" and "Ohne mein Team". All are at least certified gold by the BVMI, while "Ohne mein Team" is certified diamond.

Spotify crowned RAF Camora as the most streamed German-language artist in 2017 and 2018, respectively.

Albums

Studio albums

Collaborative albums

Mixtapes

Extended plays

Singles

As lead artist

As featured artist

Other charted songs

Guest appearances

Music videos

As lead artist

As featured artist

Notes

References

Discographies of German artists
Hip hop discographies